The men's 5000 metres at the 1954 European Athletics Championships was held in Bern, Switzerland, at Stadion Neufeld on 26 and 29 August 1954.

Medalists

Results

Final
29 August

Heats
26 August

Heat 1

Heat 2

Heat 3

Participation
According to an unofficial count, 28 athletes from 19 countries participated in the event.

 (1)
 (2)
 (1)
 (1)
 (2)
 (1)
 (2)
 (1)
 (2)
 (1)
 (1)
 (2)
 (1)
 (1)
 (2)
 (2)
 (2)
 (2)
 (1)

References

5000 metres
5000 metres at the European Athletics Championships